Eutropis darevskii, also known commonly as Darevsy's mabouya, Darevsky's mabuya, and Darevsky's skink, is a species of lizard in the family Scincidae. The species is endemic to Vietnam.

Etymology
The specific name, darevskii, is in honor of Russian herpetologist Ilya Darevsky.

Geographic range
E. darevskii is found in Son La Province, Vietnam.

Reproduction
The mode of reproduction of E. darevskii is unknown.

References

Further reading
Bobrov VV (1992). "[A new scincid lizard (Reptilia: Sauria: Scincidae) from Vietnam]". Zoologicheskii Zhurnal 71 (9): 156–158. (Mabuya darevskii, new species). (in Russian).
Mausfeld P, Schmitz A, Böhme W, Misov B, Vrcibradic D, Rocha CFD (2002). "Phylogenetic affinities of Mabuya atlantica Schmidt, 1945, Endemic to the Atlantic Ocean Archipelago of Fernando de Naronha (Brazil): Necessity of Partitioning the Genus Mabuya Fitzinger, 1826 (Scincidae: Lygosominae)". Zoologischer Anzeiger 241 (3): 281–293. (Eutropis darevskii, new combination).
Pham AV, Tu HV, Nguyen TV, Ziegler T, Nguyen TQ (2018). "New records and an updated list of lizards from Son La Province, Vietnam". Herpetology Notes 11: 209–216.

Eutropis
Reptiles described in 1992
Reptiles of Vietnam
Endemic fauna of Vietnam
Taxa named by Vladimir V. Bobrov